Nur Hossain Kasemi (10 January 1945 – 13 December 2020) was a Bangladeshi Deobandi Islamic scholar, politician, educator, religious speaker and spiritual figure. He was the secretary general of Hefazat-e-Islam Bangladesh and Jamiat Ulema-e-Islam Bangladesh, vice-president of Al-Haiatul Ulya Lil-Jamiatil Qawmia Bangladesh, senior vice-president of Befaqul Madarisil Arabia Bangladesh and Shaykhul Hadith and rector of Jamia Madania Baridhara, Dhaka and Jamia Sobhania Mahmud Nagar. He had played a leading role in the Hefazat movement, Khatam an-Nabiyyin movement etc. He was well-known among the Muslim masses as an Islamic leader. He was also involved in running nearly 45 Islamic seminaries.

Name and lineage 
Kasemi was born on 10 January 1945 into a Bengali Muslim family in the village of Chodda in Manoharganj under Tipperah district (now Comilla District, Bangladesh).

Education 
His education started by enrolling in a primary school near to his house. After class 4, he was admitted at Kashipur Kasemul Uloom Madrasa and studied till the Secondary class. Then he was admitted at Al Jamiatul Islamia Darul Ulum madrassa in Barura. Here, he studied till Jamaat-e Hedaya (Honours 2nd).

Then he went to India to study at Darul Ulum Deoband. He was admitted at Beritazpur madrasa in Saharanpur district after failing to reach the scheduled time. After completing Jamaat-e Jalaline (Honours), he went to Darul Uloom Deoband. He was studying at Deoband for a total of 3 years. Here, after the completion of the Masters in Hadith, he has studied Arabic literature and Philosophy.
Teachers
Among his teachers are: Mahmood Hasan Gangohi, Anzar Shah Kashmiri, Syed Fakhruddin Ahmad, Muhammad Salim Qasmi and other eminent figures.

Career 
His career started with teaching at Muradia madrassa, established by Muhammad Qasim Nanautavi, based in Muzaffarnagar district, India. After a year of teaching here, he returned to motherland in late 1973. Then he filled the positions of Shaykhul Hadith and Principal at Nandansar Mohius Sunnah Madrasa, Shariatpur District. In 1978, he went to Jamia Arabia Imdadul Uloom Faridabad in Dhaka. Here, he has been teaching for 4 years and was the director of Residential Hostel. In 1982, he came to Jamia Shariyyah Malibagh, Dhaka founded by Kazi Mutasim Billah. Here, he taught for six years in total. In 1988, he founded Jamia Madania Baridhara, Dhaka and Jamia Sobhania Mahmood Nagar in 1998. Since its inception, he was the rector and Shaykhul Hadith of both seminaries. He was also involved in the management of nearly 45 Islamic Seminaries.

On 3 October 2020, he was elected as senior vice president of Befaqul Madarisil Arabia Bangladesh. According to law, he was also the vice president of Al-Haiatul Ulya Lil-Jamiatil Qawmia Bangladesh.

On 15 November 2020, he was elected secretary general of Hefazat-e-Islam Bangladesh and was the president of Hefazat, Dhaka Chapter.

Politics 
In 1975, he entered politics with Jamiat Ulema-e-Islam Bangladesh. He came to the central leadership of Jamiat in 1990 and on 7 November 2015 he became its secretary general.

From 1990 to 2000, he was involved in the Khatam an-Nabiyyin movement and served as general secretary.

Family 
In his family life, he was the father of two sons: Jubair Hussain and Jaber Qassemi, and two daughters. His younger son Jaber Qassemi is an Islamic scholar and professor at Jamia Mahmoodia Ishaqia, Maniknagar.

Death 
He died on 13 December 2020 at United Hospital, Dhaka.

In 2021, Yasin Abdur Rauf wrote a biography of him in Arabic. "Nur Hossain Kasemi Conference" was held on 9 January 2021 in Savar.

See also
 Shah Ahmad Shafi
 Junaid Babunagari
 Nurul Islam Jihadi
 A F M Khalid Hossain
 Muhiuddin Khan
 Mamunul Haque
 Mahmudul Hasan

References

Bibliography

External links

1945 births
2020 deaths
Bangladeshi Islamic religious leaders
Bangladeshi Sunni Muslim scholars of Islam
Bengali Muslim scholars of Islam
Darul Uloom Deoband alumni
Deobandis
Hanafis
Jamiat Ulema-e-Islam Bangladesh politicians
People from Comilla District
Secretary General of Jamiat Ulema-e-Islam Bangladesh
20th-century Bengalis
21st-century Bengalis